His and Hers is the fourth studio album from country music duo Joey + Rory. The album was released on July 31, 2012, via Vanguard Records and Sugar Hill Records. "When I'm Gone" and "Josephine" served as the album's first two singles and were simultaneously released to radio before the album. "Teaching Me How to Love You" previously appeared on Blaine Larsen's debut album Off to Join the World, which was co-produced by Rory Lee Feek and featured Joey Feek on backing vocals.

Track listing
"Josephine" (Rory Lee Feek) – 5:21
"Waiting for Someone" (R.L. Feek, Erin Enderlin) – 3:21
"Someday When I Grow Up" (R.L. Feek, Tonya Lynette Stout, Dan Demay) – 2:52
"Let's Pretend We Never Met" (Kent Blazy, Leslie Satcher) – 2:40
"A Bible and a Belt" (R.L. Feek, Phillip Coleman) – 3:35
"When I'm Gone" (Sandy Emory Lawrence) – 3:55
"Your Man Loves You Honey" (Tom T. Hall) – 2:20
"Love Your Man" (Heidi Feek, Joey Feek, R.L. Feek) – 2:36
"Cryin' Smile" (Phil O'Donnell, Gary Hannan, Ken Johnson) – 3:17
"He's a Cowboy" (David C. Banning, Cleve Clark, AJ Clark) – 4:08
"Teaching Me How to Love You" (R.L. Feek, Marty Dodson) – 2:46
"His and Hers" (R.L. Feek, Erin Enderlin) – 2:55

Personnel

Joey + Rory
 Rory Feek - lead vocals, background vocals
 Joey Feek - lead vocals, background vocals

Additional Musicians
 Alvarado Road Show - background vocals
 Steve Brewster - drums
 Dennis Crouch - bass guitar
 Stuart Duncan - fiddle, viola
 Heidi Feek - background vocals
 Mike Johnson - steel guitar
 Randy Kohrs - dobro
 Sandy Emory Lawrence - background vocals
 Gordon Mote - piano
 Jon Randall Stewart - acoustic guitar, baritone guitar, electric guitar, background vocals
 Bryan Sutton - acoustic guitar, electric guitar, mandolin
 Glenn Worf - bass guitar

Chart performance
Album
His and Hers debuted at number 112 on the U.S. Billboard 200, as well as number 24 on the U.S. Billboard Top Country Albums and number 19 on U.S. Billboard Independent Albums charts.

Singles

References

Joey + Rory albums
Sugar Hill Records albums
Vanguard Records albums
2012 albums